Krnjak is a village and a municipality in Karlovac County, Croatia.

Languages and names 
On the territory of Krnjak municipality, along with Croatian which is official in the whole country, as a second official language has been introduced Serbian language and Serbian Cyrillic alphabet.

Population
There are a total of 1,985 inhabitants in the municipality (census 2011), 68.6% which are Serbs and 29.2% which are Croats. By mother tongue there are 1,620 Croatian speakers, 201 Serbian speakers and 164 speakers of other languages. The municipality is part of Kordun.

Settlements
The settlements in the municipality are: 

 Bijeli Klanac (population 1)
 Brebornica (population 63)
 Budačka Rijeka (population 245)
 Burić Selo (population 29)
 Čatrnja (population 133)
 Donji Budački (population 136)
 Dugi Dol (population 94)
 Dvorište (population 53)
 Gornji Budački (population 28)
 Gornji Skrad (population 67)
 Grabovac Krnjački (population 85)
 Grabovac Vojnićki (population 55)
 Hrvatsko Žarište (population 35)
 Jasnić Brdo (population 10)
 Keserov Potok (population 8)
 Krnjak (population 371)
 Mala Crkvina (population 42)
 Mlakovac (population 118)
 Pavković Selo (population 51)
 Perići (population 22)
 Podgorje Krnjačko (population 48)
 Poljana Vojnićka (population 18)
 Ponorac (population 40)
 Rastovac Budački (population 13)
 Suhodol Budački (population 8)
 Trupinjak (population 1)
 Velika Crkvina (population 68)
 Vojnović Brdo (population 9)
 Zagorje (population 83)
 Zimić (population 51)

Hrvatsko Žarište, once called Partizansko Žarište, was famous for its elementary school, that was founded by family Vidić.

References

External links 
  

Municipalities of Croatia
Populated places in Karlovac County